The Salt Cathedral of Zipaquirá is an underground Roman Catholic church built within the tunnels of a salt mine  underground in a halite mountain near the city of Zipaquirá, in Cundinamarca, Colombia. It is a tourist destination and place of pilgrimage in the country. The temple at the bottom has three sections, representing the birth, life, and death of Jesus. The icons, ornaments and architectural details are hand carved in the halite rock. Some marble sculptures are included. The cathedral is considered one of the most notable achievements of Colombian architecture, being described as a "Jewel of Modern Architecture". The cathedral represents a valuable cultural, environmental and religious patrimony for the Colombian people.

The cathedral is a functioning church that receives as many as 3,000 visitors on Sundays, but it has no bishop and therefore no official status as a cathedral in Catholicism.

Geology 
Salt deposits in Zipaquirá were formed around 250 million years ago, and were raised above sea level during the late Tertiary period, when the Andes were formed.

Location 
National highway 45A connects Bogotá and Zipaquirá, as does the Tren Turistico De La Sabana (Savanna tourist train). The city is recognized, not only for the cathedral, but for being near one of the oldest human settlements in the Americas, El Abra archaeological site.

History 
The halite mines were exploited already by the pre-Columbian Muisca culture since the 5th century BC. being one of their most important economic activities.
The traditional halite mining was described by Alexander von Humboldt during his visit to Zipaquira in 1801. He depicts this deposit as bigger than the main halite mines of the time, such as those in Spain, Switzerland, Poland and the County of Tyrol with a calculated resource estimation of one million cubic meters. Von Humboldt also criticized the excavation techniques as being unpractical for future exploitation, recommending drift mining instead, since the halite tunnels don't require beams, lowering the costs.

Old cathedral 

Years before the underground church was built (around 1932), the miners had carved a sanctuary, as a place for their daily prayers asking for protection to the saints before starting to work. In 1950, the construction of a bigger project had begun: the Salt Cathedral which was inaugurated on August 15, 1954, and dedicated to Our Lady of the Rosary, Patron saint of miners. It was compound of three naves and a monumental cross. Part of the galleries were actually carved by the ancient Muisca. However, as the church was carved inside an active mine, structural problems and safety concerns led the authorities to shut it in September 1992. This construction cost of the original church was over 285 million U.S. dollars.
The building had 120 m  length, 5.500 m² surface and  22 m  height. It had six main columns, and a maximum capacity of 8000 people.

The main nave included the monumental cross, which was illuminated from the base up, projecting a large cross-shaped shadow in the ceiling.  The right nave included the Stations of the Cross icons and the Rosary chapel, with the Virgin of Rosary Icon (sculpted by Daniel Rodriguez Moreno and later transported to the new cathedral). The left nave included the icons of the birth of Jesus and the baptism of Jesus, with a waterfall symbolising the Jordan River.

New cathedral 

The Industrial Investment Institute, together with  Salinas Concession and the Colombian Society of Architects opened a contest for the design of the new cathedral, the winner of which was the project presented by Roswell Garavito Pearl which included structural changes in the access tunnel and the dome.

In 1991 the construction of a new cathedral was undertaken, 200 feet under the older one. This new Cathedral was inaugurated on December 16, 1995. Its various corridors and sanctuaries were achieved by making small but significant additions to the caves left behind by previous mining operations.

The main sections of the building are:
 The Stations of the Cross:  At the entrance of the church, there are 14 small chapels, representing the stations of the cross, which illustrate the events of Jesus' last journey. Each station has a cross and several kneeling platforms carved into the halite structure.
 The Dome: Located at the end of the main descending entrance ramp. From here, the visitor descends to the bas relief cross chambers, the balcony and the Narthex labyrinth.
 The three naves: They are interconnected by a crack, symbolising the birth and death of Christ. Copies of Creation of Adam and Pietá can be seen.
Four large cylindric columns represent the Four Evangelists

The cathedral has an electrical generator and access for vehicles to the inner space (for emergencies only).

Salt Park 

The cathedral is within a larger complex, Parque de la Sal (Salt Park), which also includes a museum of mining, mineralogy, geology and natural resources. Visitors can observe pieces of art, depictions of the mining process, geology displays, educational exhibitions about environmental friendly mining and sustainable development

The main places at the park are:
 The Sacred Axis,  a square with a halite hand carved cross ( height)
 The Salt Dome
 The mine
 The Brine Museum, where visitors learn about the extraction process of salt from the halite.  Also, exhibitions of the geological studies, engineering and architecture process in the creation of the cathedral can be seen.
 The Reservoir
 The Forests
 The Salt auditorium.

See also 
 Nemocón, neighbouring salt mine to the northeast
 Bochnia Salt Mine, southern Poland, central Europe
 Wieliczka Salt Mine, near Kraków in Poland, central Europe
 Khewra Salt Mine, in Punjab, Pakistan
 Kartchner Caverns State Park in Arizona, United States
 Grand Roc in Savoie, France, southern Europe
 Chełm Chalk Tunnels, Poland, central Europe
 Frasassi Caves, Ancona in Italy, southern Europe
 Salina Turda, Transylvania, Romania
 List of colossal sculptures in situ

References

External links 
 
  Catedral de Sal de Zipaquirá, Official site of the Salt Cathedral
  "Catedral de Sal": An art film by H. Paul Moon
  El Tiempo: Catedral de Sal de Zipaquirá: el milagro de los mineros en las entrañas de la tierra

Roman Catholic churches in Colombia
Roman Catholic churches completed in 1954
Roman Catholic churches completed in 1995
Tourist attractions near Bogotá
Buildings and structures in Cundinamarca Department
Tourist attractions in Cundinamarca Department
Salt museums
Salt mines in Colombia
Cave churches
Buildings and structures in Zipaquirá
20th-century Roman Catholic church buildings in Colombia